The 2002 Davidoff Swiss Indoors was a men's tennis tournament played on indoor carpet courts at the St. Jakobshalle in Basel in Switzerland and was part of the International Series of the 2002 ATP Tour. The tournament ran from 21 October through 27 October 2002. Sixth-seeded David Nalbandian won the singles title.

Finals

Singles

 David Nalbandian defeated  Fernando González 6–4, 6–3, 6–2
 It was Nalbandian's 2nd title of the year and the 2nd of his career.

Doubles

 Bob Bryan /  Mike Bryan defeated  Mark Knowles /  Daniel Nestor 7–6(7–1), 7–5
 It was Bob Bryan's 5th title of the year and the 9th of his career. It was Mike Bryan's 7th title of the year and the 11th of his career.

References

External links
 Official website 
 ATP tournament profile

 
Davidoff Swiss Indoors
Swiss Indoors